In geometry, the gyrate rhombicosidodecahedron is one of the Johnson solids. It is also a canonical polyhedron.

Related polyhedron 

It can be constructed as a rhombicosidodecahedron with one pentagonal cupola rotated through 36 degrees. They have the same faces around each vertex, but vertex configurations along the rotation become a different order, .

Alternative Johnson solids, constructed by rotating different cupolae of a rhombicosidodecahedron, are: 
 The parabigyrate rhombicosidodecahedron where two opposing cupolae are rotated;
 The metabigyrate rhombicosidodecahedron where two non-opposing cupolae are rotated; 
 And the trigyrate rhombicosidodecahedron where three cupolae are rotated.

External links
 

Johnson solids